Charlie Kay Chakkar Mein is a 2015 Bollywood neo-noir crime thriller film written and directed by Manish Srivastav.

Cast
Naseeruddin Shah as Sanket Pujari 
Anand Tiwari as Deepak Kumar
Manasi Rachh as Nina
Amit Sial as Sam
Subrat Dutta as Sohail
Vikas Anand as Hussaini (guest appearance)
Sanam Singh as Rahil
Siraj Mustafa as Jabbar
Auroshikha Dey as Sameera the cop
Disha Arora as Hera (Debut)
Nishant Lal  (Debut)
Aanchal Nandrajog 
Sandeep Vasudevan
Shweta Sharma (sizzling appearance in "I am Single")
Elena Fernandes (sizzling appearance in "Let's Playboy")

Plot
Four youngsters addicted to drugs get involved in an accident concerning a gangster.

Production

This film has been shot in Mumbai, Maharashtra (India).

Soundtrack 
Film's soundtrack was composed, sung and written by Harry Anand, Rohit Kulkarni, Vishal Mishra, Gurinder Seagal.

Release
This film has released in India on 6 November 2015 to mixed reviews.

See also
False confession

References

External links
 
 

2015 films
Indian neo-noir films
Indian crime thriller films
2015 crime thriller films
2010s erotic thriller films
2010s Hindi-language films
Films about criminals
Indian nonlinear narrative films
Indian avant-garde and experimental films
Indian erotic thriller films
Films about the illegal drug trade
Films about drugs
Films about heroin addiction
Films about organised crime in India
Films set in Mumbai
2010s avant-garde and experimental films